Barq is a Pakistani missile.

Barq may also refer to:
Shafiqur Rahman Barq (born 1930), Indian politician
Barq's, American soft drink brand

See also